The men's sprint competition at the 2023 FIL World Luge Championships was held on 27 January 2023.

Results
The qualification was held at 11:40 and the final at 15:11.

References

Men's sprint